Shobeliyeh (also Romanized as Shobelīyeh; also known as Shobeylīyeh and Shobeylīyeh-ye Do) is a village in Jahad Rural District, Hamidiyeh District, Ahvaz County, Khuzestan Province, Iran. At the 2006 census, its population was 339, in 62 families.

References 

Populated places in Ahvaz County